Union Parish School Board is a school district headquartered in Farmerville, Louisiana, United States. It is run by the Union Parish School Board and serves Union Parish.

In the 2012–2013 school year, Union Parish public schools had the highest rate of improvement statewide in the annual end-of-course examinations administered in Algebra I and English II.

Schools

High schools
 Union Parish High School, sometimes abbreviated as UPHS. (Farmerville)
•D’Arbonne Woods Charter School, sometimes abbreviated as DWCS.
•Union Christian Academy, sometimes abbreviated as UCA.

Junior high schools
 Union Parish Junior High School, sometimes abbreviated as UPJH. (Farmerville)

Union Parish Junior High was originally named Farmerville Junior High, but was changed in 2014. The principal of this complex is currently Kristy Auger.

Elementary schools
 Farmerville Elementary School (Unincorporated area, located on Louisiana Highway 33)

Former Schools
 Farmerville High School

Notes
Bernice and Downsville plan to close in preparation for the integration of a high school serving all of Union Parish.
The district is known for having the oldest fleet of school buses in the state.
The Union Parish High School football team won the 2013 3-A State Championship game on December 13, 2013, securing a 14–1 season with a 33–27 win against Livonia High School in their first state championship since 2001. The game was a memorial to Jaleel Gipson, who died earlier that year from injuries he sustained during a playoff at the age of 17.

References

External links
 

Education in Union Parish, Louisiana
School districts in Louisiana